Aulacofusus is a genus of sea snails, marine gastropod mollusks in the subfamily Neptuneinae of the family Buccinidae, the true whelks.

Species
According to the World Register of Marine Species (WoRMS), the following species with valid names are included within the genus Aulacofusus :
 Aulacofusus brevicauda (Deshayes, 1832)
 Aulacofusus calamaeus (Dall, 1907)
 Aulacofusus calathus (Dall, 1919)
 Aulacofusus coerulescens Kuroda & Habe in Habe, 1961
 Aulacofusus esychus (Dall, 1907)
 Aulacofusus gulbini Kosyan & Kantor, 2013
 Aulacofusus herendeeni (Dall, 1902)
 Aulacofusus hiranoi (Shikama, 1962)
 Aulacofusus ombronius (Dall, 1919)
 Aulacofusus periscelidus (Dall, 1891)

Species brought into synonymy
 Aulacofusus capponius (Dall, 1919): synonym of Colus pulcius (Dall, 1919)
 Aulacofusus halidonus Dall, 1919: synonym of Colus halidonus (Dall, 1919) (original combination)
 Aulacofusus halimeris Dall, 1919: synonym of Colus halimeris (Dall, 1919) (original combination)
 Aulacofusus insulapratasensis Okutani & Lan, 1994: synonym of Phaenomenella insulapratasensis (Okutani & Lan, 1994) (original combination)
 Aulacofusus kurilensis Golikov & Gulbin, 1977: synonym of Aulacofusus brevicauda (Deshayes, 1832)
 Aulacofusus morditus Dall, 1919: synonym of Latisipho morditus (Dall, 1919) (original combination)
 Aulacofusus nobilis (Dall, 1919): synonym of Aulacofusus herendeeni (Dall, 1902)
 Aulacofusus pulcius Dall, 1919: synonym of Colus pulcius (Dall, 1919) (original combination)
 Aulacofusus sapius (Dall, 1919): synonym of Fusipagoda sapia (Dall, 1919)
 Aulacofusus schantaricus (Middendorff, 1849): synonym of Aulacofusus brevicauda (Deshayes, 1832)
 Aulacofusus severinus Dall, 1919: synonym of Latisipho severinus (Dall, 1919) (original combination)
 Aulacofusus spitzbergensis (Reeve, 1855): synonym of Aulacofusus brevicauda (Deshayes, 1832)
 Aulacofusus timetus Dall, 1919: synonym of Latisipho timetus (Dall, 1919) (original combination)

References

 Kosyan A.R. & Kantor Yu.I. (2013). Revision of the genus Aulacofusus Dall, 1918 (Gastropoda: Buccinidae). Ruthenica<. 23(1): 1-33. 

Buccinidae
Gastropod genera